Ilanga impolita is a species of sea snail, a marine gastropod mollusk in the family Solariellidae.

Description
The size of the shell attains 14 mm.

Distribution
This species occurs in the Indian Ocean off Transkei, South Africa.

References

External links
 To World Register of Marine Species

impolita
Gastropods described in 1987